Rafaelnymphes is an extinct genus of lacewing in the family Nymphidae known from a fossil found in South America. The genus contains a single species, Rafaelnymphes cratoensis.

History and classification
When first described, R. cratoensis was known from a single fossil adult which is a compression-impression fossil preserved in layers of soft sedimentary rock. Along with other well-preserved insect fossils, the R. cratoensis specimen was collected from layers of the Upper Aptian Crato Formation. The formation is composed of unweathered grey and oxidized yellow limestones, which preserved numerous insects, fish, birds and reptiles as a notable lagerstätten. The area is a preserved inland lake or one of a series of lakes, though the nature as a fresh or salt-water body is uncertain. The depth of the basin has been suggested as either shallow or fairly deep. The basin formed near the center of the supercontinent Gondwana during the early part of the diversification of flowering plants.

The R. cratoensis holotype specimen was preserved in the Wyoming Dinosaur Center-Crato collection when first studied. The fossil was described by an international team of paleontologists led by Justine Myskowiak in a 2016 paper. The genus name is a combination of Rafael, a patronym honoring Rafael Martins-Neto who specialized in insects of the Crato Formation and nymphes, taken from the family name Nymphidae. They coined the specific epithet cratoensis in reference to the type locality the Crato Formation.

R. cratoensis is one of several neuropteran species described from the Crato Formation. Other species include the nymphid Araripenymphes seldoni, the ithonid Principiala incerta and the kalligrammatids Makarkinia adamsi and Makarkinia kerneri.

Description
The antennae, parts of the legs and the genitalia were not preserved. Additionally, details of the upper body, such as the presence of ocelli could not be determined. The head is rectangular in outline with the large compound eyes positioned on the sides. There are small trichosors present along the apical rear edges of the forewings, and as typical for the family, nygmata are not present on any of the wings. The forewings and hindwings are preserved overlapping each other, obscuring detail of the hindwing venation.

References

External links

Prehistoric insect genera
Neuroptera genera
Cretaceous insects
Insects of South America
Early Cretaceous animals of South America
Cretaceous Brazil
Fossils of Brazil
Crato Formation
Fossil taxa described in 2016